Zegara personata is a moth in the Castniidae family. It is found in Colombia and Ecuador.

Subspecies
Zegara personata personata (Ecuador)
Zegara personata daguana (Preiss, 1899) (Colombia)
Zegara personata juanita (Preiss, 1899) (Colombia)

References

Moths described in 1865
Castniidae